Theodore Preston Hill (born December 28, 1943) is an American mathematician specializing in probability theory. He is a professor emeritus at the Georgia Institute of Technology and a researcher at California Polytechnic State University, San Luis Obispo.

Contributions
Hill is known for his research on mathematical probability theory, in particular for his work on Benford's law, and for his work in the theories of optimal stopping (secretary problems) and fair division, in particular the Hill-Beck land division problem.

Hill has attracted attention for a paper on the theory that men exhibit greater variability than women in genetically controlled traits that he wrote with Sergei Tabachnikov. It was accepted but not published by The Mathematical Intelligencer; a later version authored by Hill alone was peer reviewed and accepted by The New York Journal of Mathematics (NYJM) and retracted after publication. A revised version, again authored by Hill alone, was subsequently peer reviewed again and published in the Journal of Interdisciplinary Mathematics.

Education and career
Born in Flatbush, New York, he studied at the United States Military Academy at West Point (Distinguished Graduate of the Class of 1966), and Stanford University (M.S. in Operations Research).  After graduating from the U.S. Army Ranger School and serving as an Army Captain in the Combat Engineers of the 25th Infantry Division in Vietnam, he returned to study mathematics at the University of Göttingen (Fulbright Scholar), the University of California at Berkeley (M.A., Ph.D. under advisor Lester Dubins), and as NATO/NSF Postdoctoral Fellow at Leiden University.

He spent most of his career as a professor in the School of Mathematics at the Georgia Institute of Technology, with temporary appointments at Washington University in St. Louis, Tel Aviv University, the University of Hawaii, the University of Göttingen (Fulbright Professor), the University of Costa Rica, the Free University of Amsterdam, the Mexican Centre for Mathematical Research (CIMAT), and as Gauss Professor in the Göttingen Academy of Sciences.  He is currently professor emeritus of mathematics at the Georgia Institute of Technology and Research Scholar in Residence at California Polytechnic State University, San Luis Obispo.

Selected publications

References

External links

1943 births
20th-century American mathematicians
21st-century American mathematicians
Living people
United States Army personnel of the Vietnam War
Georgia Tech faculty
Stanford University School of Engineering alumni
United States Military Academy alumni
Washington University in St. Louis mathematicians
Probability theorists
People from Flatbush, Brooklyn
Mathematicians from New York (state)
Fair division researchers
Washington University in St. Louis faculty
Academic staff of Tel Aviv University
University of Hawaiʻi faculty
Academic staff of the University of Costa Rica
Academic staff of Vrije Universiteit Amsterdam
UC Berkeley College of Letters and Science alumni